Karol Itzitery Piña Cisneros (born November 9, 1999) known professionally as Karol Sevilla is a Mexican actress, singer and songwriter. She began her career as a child, in the Latin American telenovela La Rosa De Guadalupe and she played Luna Valente in the Disney Channel series Soy Luna (2016-18). She is also stars in the Disney+ Latin American series It Was Always Me.

Life and career 
Karol Sevilla was born in Mexico City, and has an older brother named Mauricio. She attended the CEA Infantil from 2006 through 2008. Karol Sevilla began her artistic career in television commercials at the age of six. Since then, she has appeared in numerous television series including: Amorcito corazón, Como dice el dicho, and La rosa de Guadalupe. She has also appeared in musicals, including The Wizard of Oz, Fantabulosa, and Timbiriche. From 2016 to 2018, she played the role of Luna Valente in the series Soy Luna. In 2021, she was set to star in the Disney+ original drama series Siempre Fui Yo as Guadalupe Díaz.

Filmography

Theater

Discography

Soundtrack albums

Singles

Promotional singles

Other appearances

Tours

Headlining
 Que Se Pare El Mundo Tour (2018–2020)

Co-headlining
 Soy Luna En Concierto (2016-2017)
 Soy Luna Live (2017–2018)
 Soy Luna En Vivo (2018)

Awards and nominations

References

External links 
 
 
 

1999 births
21st-century Mexican actresses
Actresses from Mexico City
Living people
Mexican child actresses
Mexican stage actresses
Mexican telenovela actresses